Zhu Shen (1879 – July 2, 1943) was a politician and public prosecutor in the Republic of China. He was an important politician during the Provisional Government of the Republic of China and the Wang Jingwei regime. His courtesy name was Boyuan. He was born in Yongqing, Zhili (Hebei).

Biography

Zhu Shen went to Japan and studied law in Tokyo Imperial University where he graduated with the degree of L. L. B. Later he returned to China, in August 1912 he was appointed Acting Chief Procurator of the Local Procuratorate in Peking. In November 1913, he was appointed Chief Procurator the Metropolitan High Procuratorate. In November 1915, he promoted to be chief of the Chief Procuratorate.

In March 1918, Zhu Shen was appointed Minister for Justice of the Duan Qirui Cabinet. In next June he was concurrently appointed Minister for Interior upon the resignation of Qian Nengxun from the Ministry and the Premiership. In December he was relieved of the concurrent post. He was a strong supporter of the Anhui clique.

In July 1920, Anhui Clique was beaten by Zhili clique in the Zhili–Anhui War, Zhu Shen was also placed on the wanted-list, so he escaped to Tianjin. He was pardoned in December 1923. In 1925 he was appointed Manager of the Capital under the Provisional Chief Executive, Duan Qirui. But in next year he resigned his post, and went into the business circle.

In December 1937, Wang Kemin established the Provisional Government of the Republic of China, Zhu Shen also participated in it. Zhu was appointed Minister for Justice. In 1939 he also held President of the Power Company in Northern China. In March 1940 the Wang Jingwei Regime was established, Zhu Shen was appointed Executive Member and Chief of the Agency for Political Affairs of the North China Political Council, etc. In February 1943 he was promoted to be Chairperson of the North China Political Council.

Zhu Shen died of illness at Beijing on July 2, 1943.

References

Footnotes 

 Zheng Renjia, "The Biographical Sketch of Zhu Shen"Biographical Writings Website (need Traditional Chinese font)
 
 
 
 
 

Politicians from Langfang
Republic of China politicians from Hebei
Chinese collaborators with Imperial Japan
1879 births
1943 deaths
Chinese police officers
Justice Ministers of the Republic of China